Fuck Christmas, I Got The Blues is the second studio album by the artist The Legendary Tigerman, released in 2003.

Recorded at AMPstudio, Viana do Castelo, Portugal. Recorded, Mixed, Produced and Mastered by Paulo Miranda. There's also a Master for vinyl LP release that never happened.
Recording was done with a Studiomaster 12-2 analog console and into a Tascam ATR 60-16 1 inch, 16 track, reel-to-reel recorder. All microphones used in the recording were dynamic mics. Amplifiers used were a Vox AC30 and a Fender Bassman, both vintage, early releases.

Track 1 in the album, «In Cold Blood», was improvised and recorded during the first conversation between The Legendary Tigerman (Paulo Furtado) and Guilherme Barbosa (harp) who had just met, minutes ago.

All backing vocals are by Ana Figueiras.

The inclusion of the track "I Walk The Line" was a last-minute decision. The guitar is being played through a Korg MS-20 synthesizer, and other sounds were broadcast in short wave and subsequently tuned, captured and recorded through a Yaesu FRG7 receiver.

Track listing 

 In Cold Blood
 Fuck Christmas, I Got The Blues
 Don't You Murder Me
 Crawdad Hole
 I Walk The Line (Johnny Cash cover)
 Love Train
 Keep 'Em Dogs On It
 Ramble (Link Wray / Milt Grant)
 Your Life Is A Lie
 Big Black Boat

References 
 CD Universe <http://www.cduniverse.com/productinfo.asp?pid=7104407>

2003 albums
The Legendary Tigerman albums